The Dilley sextuplets (born May 25, 1993) are the United States' first set of surviving sextuplets, born to Becki and Keith Dilley in Indianapolis, Indiana, United States. They are, in birth order:

Biography
The siblings were the first surviving sextuplets to be born in the USA.

The parents of the sextuplets, Becki and Keith Dilley, met as co-workers at a Wendy's restaurant in Indiana. They married and attempted to conceive for 5 years without results. Following consultation with a doctor, they were told they had little chance of conceiving naturally. Following several more years of trying to conceive, they underwent fertility treatment using the drug Pergonal. The sextuplets were conceived as a result of this.

Throughout the pregnancy, all ultrasounds showed five babies. After five had been delivered the doctor reached in to retrieve the placenta and grabbed a foot instead, and said, "There's a sixth baby."  Everyone initially thought she was kidding, but she wasn't. The sixth was hiding behind the mother's spleen.

The Dilley children have appeared on a few television segments, but say that they don't want to live life "under a microscope".

From 1997 the family have lived in Northeastern Indiana.

Popular culture
An American film telling the story of the sextuplets' parents prior, and a few years after their births, called Half a Dozen Babies featuring Scott Reeves and Melissa Reeves was made in 1999 for ABC.

Further reading
Special Delivery: How We Are Raising America's Only Sextuplets...and Loving It, by Barbara M Dilley, Becki Dilley, Sam Stall. Publisher: Random House, Date Published: 1995, 
Sixty Fingers, Sixty Toes: See How the Dilley Sextuplets Grow, by Becki Dilley, Keith Dilley, E. Anthony Valainis. Publisher: Walker & Company, Date Published: 1997, .

References

1993 births
Living people
Sextuplets
People from Indianapolis
People from Berne, Indiana